Suhi Vrh is a settlement in the hills north of Prevalje in the Carinthia region in northern Slovenia.

References

External links
Suhi Vrh on Geopedia

Populated places in the Municipality of Prevalje